The Battle of Wai was fought in the fall of 1687 as a part of the Mughal–Maratha Wars.Maratha emperor Sambhaji  sent his forces to counteract Sarja Khan, sent by Aurangzeb for the purpose of conquering Raigad.

Background
In April 1685, Mughal emperor Aurangzeb managed to consolidate his power by first capturing Maratha allies, the Muslim kingdoms of Golkonda and Bijapur. He broke his treaties with both kingdoms, attacked them and captured them by September 1686. While Aurangzeb was away at the Siege of Golconda, the Mughals invaded Satara district. And after his victory at Golconda, Aurangzeb was able to concentrate on the Marathas.

Battle
Maratha Empire Commander-in-Chief Hambirrao Mohite led the Maratha side in the battle. Sarja Khan (a Bijapur general who has joined the Mughel's) led the Mughal force. Although the Maratha won, Hambirao Mohite was struck and killed by a cannonball during the battle.

Aftermath
While the battle was a victory for the Maratha's, the loss of the celebrated Hambirao Mohite weakened Sambhaji's political position considerably and many of his troops deserted him. Hambirao was replaced as senapati by Malhoji Ghorpade. Sambhaji went to the Western Ghats along with his close friend and counselor Kavi Kalash, leading eventually to the Mughal Army surrounding the Sambhaji's camp and capturing the Maratha leader.

References

1687 in India
Battles involving the Mughal Empire
Battles involving the Maratha Empire